The 1980 Cornell Big Red football team was an American football team that represented Cornell University during the 1980 NCAA Division I-A football season. Cornell finished second in the Ivy League. 

In its fourth season under head coach Bob Blackman, the team compiled a 5–5 record but was outscored 191 to 179. Team captains were Tom Rohlfing and Dan Scully. 

Cornell's 5–2 conference record placed second in the Ivy League standings. The Big Red outscored Ivy opponents 144 to 77. 

Ivy League football teams expanded their schedules to 10 games in 1980, making this the first year since 1954 that the Big Red played three games against non-Ivy opponents.

Cornell played its home games at Schoellkopf Field in Ithaca, New York.

Schedule

Roster

References

Cornell
Cornell Big Red football seasons
Cornell Big Red football